Sodium diacetate is a compound with formula . It is a salt of acetic acid.  It is a colorless solid that is used in seasonings and as an antimicrobial agent.

Preparation and structure
The salt forms upon half-neutralization of acetic acid followed by evaporation of the solution.  It can be viewed as the result of homoassociation, an effect that enhances the acidity of acetic acid in concentrated solution:
 2 CH3CO2H  +  NaOH   →   Na+[(CH3CO2)2H]−  +  H2O

Also described as the sodium acid salt of acetic acid, it is best described as the sodium salt of the hydrogen-bonded anion (CH3CO2)2H−.  The O···O distance is about 2.47 angstrom.  The species has no significant existence in solution but forms stable crystals.

Applications
As a food additive, it has E number E262 and is used to impart a salt and vinegar flavor.

See also
 Sodium acetate

References

Acetates
Organic sodium salts
Acid salts
Food additives